Anglesey includes the largest island in Wales, as well as various smaller islands. Just as Anglesey is joined by bridges to the mainland, so Holy Island is linked to Anglesey. The 143 scheduled monuments cover over 4,000 years of the history of the islands. Spread throughout the interior and especially the coast of the islands there are 89 prehistoric scheduled sites, including chambered tombs, burial cairns and standing stones, hillforts, hut circles and a henge. Six sites date from the Roman period, and seven from early medieval times. The 18 sites from the medieval post-Norman period include spectacular castles, remote dwellings, and wells, stones and churches. Finally the modern period is mainly agrarian in its purposes, but also includes the copper, coal and brickmaking industries. After a spell as part of Gwynedd, the Isle of Anglesey County now covers the same area as the historic county of Anglesey.

Scheduled monuments are found in 34 of the 40 Community areas on the Isle of Anglesey. Clusters are found in Moelfre on the eastern side (14), Trearddur on Holy Island (11), Llanidan overlooking the Menai Strait (10) and Llangoed in the far east (10). One site, Beaumaris Castle, is part of a World Heritage Site and this plus a further 22 of the monuments are in the care of the Welsh heritage agency, Cadw.

Scheduled monuments have statutory protection. The compilation of the list is undertaken by Cadw Welsh Historic Monuments, which is an executive agency of the National Assembly of Wales. The list of scheduled monuments below is supplied by Cadw with additional material from Royal Commission on the Ancient and Historical Monuments of Wales and Gwynedd Archaeological Trust.

Scheduled monuments in Anglesey
The list is sorted by period, and then by community so that sites of similar age and locality are placed near each other. Clicking on one of the heading arrows will sort the list by that information.

See also
List of Cadw properties
List of castles in Wales
List of hill forts in Wales
Historic houses in Wales
List of monastic houses in Wales
List of museums in Wales
List of Roman villas in Wales

References
Coflein is the online database of RCAHMW: Royal Commission on the Ancient and Historical Monuments of Wales, GAT is the Gwynedd Archaeological Trust, Cadw is the Welsh Historic Monuments Agency

Anglesey